Roger Kynard "Roky" Erickson (July 15, 1947 – May 31, 2019) was an American musician and singer-songwriter. He was a founding member and the leader of the 13th Floor Elevators and a pioneer of the psychedelic rock genre.

Biography
Erickson was born in Dallas, Texas, to Roger and Evelyn Erickson, and had four younger brothers. The nickname "Roky", a contraction of his first and middle names, was given to him by his parents. His father, an architect and civil engineer, was stern and disapproving of Erickson's countercultural attitudes, once forcibly cutting his son's hair rather than allow him to grow it out Beatles-style. His mother was an amateur artist and opera singer, and encouraged Erickson's musical talent by taking guitar lessons herself so she could teach him.

Erickson was interested in music from his youth, playing piano from age five and taking up guitar at 10. He attended school in Austin and dropped out of Travis High School in 1965, one month before graduating, rather than cut his hair to conform to the school dress code. 
Erickson wrote his first songs, "You're Gonna Miss Me" and "We Sell Soul", at age 15, and started a band with neighborhood friends which would evolve into his first notable group, the Spades. The Spades scored a regional hit with "We Sell Soul"; the song is included as an unlisted bonus track on Erickson's 1995 album All That May Do My Rhyme and was adapted as "Don't Fall Down" by the 13th Floor Elevators for their debut album.

The 13th Floor Elevators

In late 1965, at age 18, Erickson co-founded the 13th Floor Elevators. He and bandmate Tommy Hall were the main songwriters. Early in her career, singer Janis Joplin considered joining the Elevators, but Family Dog's Chet Helms persuaded her to go to San Francisco instead, where she found major fame.

The band released their debut album The Psychedelic Sounds of the 13th Floor Elevators in 1966. It contained the band's only charting single, Erickson's "You're Gonna Miss Me". A stinging breakup song, the single was a major hit on local charts in the U.S. southwest and appeared at lower positions on national singles charts as well. Critic Mark Deming writes that "If Roky Erickson had vanished from the face of the earth after The 13th Floor Elevators released their epochal debut single, "You're Gonna Miss Me", in early 1966, in all likelihood he'd still be regarded as a legend among garage rock fanatics for his primal vocal wailing and feral harmonica work."

In 1967, the band followed up with Easter Everywhere, perhaps the band's most focused effort, featuring "Slip Inside This House", and a noted cover of Bob Dylan's "It's All Over Now, Baby Blue". The album Live was released in 1968 by the band's record label, International Artists, with little to no input from the band. It featured audience applause dubbed over studio recordings of cover versions, alternate takes, and older material.

Bull of the Woods (1969) was the 13th Floor Elevators' final album on which they worked as a group and was largely the work of Stacy Sutherland. Erickson—due to health and legal problems—and Tommy Hall were only involved with a few tracks, including "Livin' On" and "May the Circle Remain Unbroken".

Mental illness and legal problems
In 1968, while performing at HemisFair, Erickson began speaking gibberish. He was soon diagnosed with paranoid schizophrenia and sent to a Houston psychiatric hospital, where he involuntarily received electroconvulsive therapy.

The Elevators were vocal proponents of marijuana and psychedelic drug use, and were subject to extra attention from law enforcement agencies. In 1969, Erickson was arrested for possession of a single marijuana joint in Austin. Facing a potential ten-year incarceration, Erickson pleaded not guilty by reason of insanity to avoid prison. He was first sent to the Austin State Hospital. After several escapes, he was sent to the Rusk State Hospital in Rusk, Texas, where he was subjected to more electroconvulsive therapy and Thorazine treatments, ultimately remaining in custody until 1972. During his time at Rusk, he continued writing songs and poetry. Family and friends managed to smuggle out some of these poems and, in 1972, self published the book Openers, intending to use the proceeds to hire a lawyer. (Various sources claim approximately 1,000 copies of Openers were printed; how many copies were actually sold remains unknown.) Six tracks from the 1999 Erickson collection Never Say Goodbye were also recorded during his time at Rusk.

Alien years
In 1974, after having been released from the state hospital, Erickson formed a new band which he called "Bleib Alien", Bleib being an anagram of Bible and/or German for "remain", and "Alien" being a pun on the German word allein ("alone") – the phrase in German, therefore, being "remain alone". His new band exchanged the psychedelic sounds of The 13th Floor Elevators for a more hard rock sound that featured lyrics on old horror film and science fiction themes. "Two Headed Dog (Red Temple Prayer)" (produced by The Sir Douglas Quintet's Doug Sahm and inspired by Vladimir Demikhov's 1950s head transplant experiments) was released as a single.

The new band was renamed Roky Erickson and the Aliens. In 1979, after playing with the Reversible Cords on May Day at Raul's, Erickson recorded 15 new songs with producer Stu Cook, former bass player of Creedence Clearwater Revival. These efforts were released in two "overlapping" LPs – Roky Erickson and the Aliens (CBS UK, 1980) and The Evil One (415 Records, 1981). Cook played bass on two tracks, "Sputnik" and "Bloody Hammer". Roky performed with The Nervebreakers as his backup band at The Palladium in Dallas in July 1979. A recording was issued on the French label New Rose and was recently re-issued elsewhere.

The Austin-based band the Explosives served as Roky's most frequent back-up band during the early Raul's era, between 1978 and the early 1980s. Billed as Roky Erickson and the Explosives, they were regulars at Raul's, the Continental Club, and other Austin venues. It was this incarnation that contributed two live tracks to the first Live at Raul's LP, released in 1980, with other Raul's top bands: The Skunks, Terminal Mind, The Next, Standing Waves, and The Explosives (without Roky Erickson). The Roky Erickson tracks ("Red Temple Prayer" and "Don't Shake Me Lucifer") were not included on the initial release for contractual reasons, but were included on a later release.
In 1982, Erickson asserted that a Martian had inhabited his body. He came to feel that, due to his being alien, human beings were attacking him psychically. A concerned friend enlisted a Notary Public to witness an official statement by Erickson that he was an alien; he hoped by declaring so publicly he would be in line with any "international laws" he might have been breaking. Erickson claimed the attacks then indeed stopped.

Creative decline and renewed interest
Beginning in the 1980s, Erickson developed a years-long obsession with the mail, often spending hours poring over random junk mail he received and writing to solicitors and celebrities (dead or living). He was arrested in 1989 on charges of mail theft for gathering up mail from the mailboxes of neighbors who had moved; Erickson collected the mail and taped it to the walls of his bedroom. The charges were dropped when Erickson insisted that he had never opened any of the mail.

In 1984 an observational documentary was produced in Austin for Swedish television, entitled Demon Angel: A Day and Night with Roky Erickson. It featured Erickson in plugged and unplugged performances, solo and with local musician/producer Mike Alvarez on additional guitar, in an underground creek beneath the Congress Street Bridge on Halloween. Alvarez later released the film on VHS, updating it with interviews of some of Erickson's friends and relatives; it was toured to several cities including Pittsburgh, where the screening was followed by a set of Erickson covers by Alvarez and others, as well as a performance by the Mount McKinleys with guest vocalist Sumner Erickson (Roky's brother). A soundtrack of the film also was issued on CD, receiving positive reviews.

Several live albums of his older material have been released since the mid-1980s, and in 1990 Sire Records/Warner Bros. Records released a tribute album, Where the Pyramid Meets the Eye, produced by WB executive Bill Bentley. It featured versions of Erickson's songs performed by The Jesus and Mary Chain, R.E.M., ZZ Top, Poi Dog Pondering, Julian Cope, Butthole Surfers, Bongwater, John Wesley Harding, Doug Sahm, and Primal Scream, among others. According to the liner notes, the title of the album came from a remark Erickson made to a friend who asked him to define psychedelic music, to which Erickson reportedly replied "It's where the pyramid meets the eye, man", an apparent reference to the Eye of Providence and the Great Seal of the United States.

Return to music and later life

In 1995, Erickson released All That May Do My Rhyme on Butthole Surfers drummer King Coffey's label Trance Syndicate Records. Produced by Texas Tornados bassist Speedy Sparks, Austin recording legend Stuart Sullivan, and Texas Music Office director Casey Monahan, the release coincided with the publication of Openers II, a complete collection of Erickson's lyrics. Published by Henry Rollins's 2.13.61 Publications, it was compiled and edited by Monahan with assistance from Rollins and Erickson's youngest brother Sumner Erickson, a classical tuba player.

Sumner was granted legal custody of Roky in 2001, and established a legal trust to aid his brother. As a result, Roky received some of the most effective medical and legal aid of his life, the latter useful in helping sort out the complicated tangle of contracts that had reduced royalty payments to all but nothing for his recorded works. He also started taking medication to better manage his schizophrenia.

A documentary film on the life of Roky Erickson titled You're Gonna Miss Me was made by director Keven McAlester and screened at the 2005 SXSW film festival. In September of the same year, Erickson performed his first full-length concert in 20 years at the annual Austin City Limits Music Festival with The Explosives with special guest and longtime associate Billy Gibbons of ZZ Top.

In the December 30, 2005, issue of the Austin Chronicle, an alternative weekly newspaper in Austin, Texas, Margaret Moser chronicled Erickson's recovery, saying Erickson had weaned himself off his medication, played at 11 gigs in Austin that year, obtained a driver's license, bought a car (a Volvo), and voted.

In 2007, Erickson played his first ever gigs in New York City at Southpaw in Brooklyn, NY, as well as California's Coachella Festival and made a debut performance in England to a capacity audience at the Royal Festival Hall, London. Roky continued to play in Europe, performing for the first time in Finland at Ruisrock festival. The performance was widely considered the highlight of the festival day.

On September 8, 2008, Scottish post-rock band Mogwai released the Batcat EP. Erickson is featured on one of the tracks, "Devil Rides". Erickson performed alongside Austin-based indie rock band Okkervil River at the Austin Music Awards in 2008 and then again at the 2009 South by Southwest music festival.

Erickson returned to the stage in 2008 to perform songs from the 13th Floor Elevators catalog that had not been performed in decades with fellow Austinites The Black Angels as his backing band. After months of practices and time recording in an Austin studio, they performed a show in Dallas followed by a West Coast tour. The Black Angels played a regular set and then backed Erickson as his rhythm section, playing 13th Floor Elevators songs as well as songs from Erickson's solo albums.

On April 20, 2010, Erickson released True Love Cast Out All Evil, his first album of new material in 14 years. Okkervil River serves as Erickson's backing band on the album.

In March 2012 Erickson toured New Zealand and Australia for the first time headlining Golden Plains Festival in Meredith as well as playing sold-out side shows in Sydney and Melbourne.

On May 10, 2015, he performed with the reunited 13th Floor Elevators at Levitation (formerly Austin Psych Fest, the event was renamed "Levitation" after the song of the same title). The band consisted of original band members Erickson, Tommy Hall, John Ike Walton, and Ronnie Leatherman, joined by Roky's son Jegar Erickson on harmonica, Roky's lead guitarist Eli Southard, and rhythm guitarist Fred Mitchim. On Oct. 7, 2018, Erickson performed outdoors to an audience of thousands at the Hardly Strictly Bluegrass Festival in San Francisco.

Death
Erickson died in Austin on May 31, 2019. His death was made public through a Facebook post by his brother Mikel, who wrote, "My brother Roky passed away peaceably today. Please allow us time." No cause of death was announced.

Discography

 Bermuda / The Interpreter (1977)
 Clear Night For Love (1985)
 Don't Slander Me (1986)
 Gremlins Have Pictures (1986)
 Casting the Runes (Roky Erickson & The Explosives, 1987)
 Holiday Inn Tapes (1987)
 Click Your Fingers Applauding The Play (1988)
 Openers (1988)
 Live at the Ritz 1987 (1988)
 Live Dallas 1979 (1992)
 All That May Do My Rhyme (1995)
 Demon Angel: A Day and a Night with Roky Erickson (1995)
 Roky Erickson and Evilhook Wildlife (1995)
 Never Say Goodbye (1999)
 Don't Knock the Rok! (2004)
 I Have Always Been Here Before (2005)
 Halloween (2008)
 True Love Cast Out All Evil (2010)

Roky Erickson and the Aliens
 Roky Erickson and the Aliens (1980)
 The Evil One (1981)

Roky Erickson and the Resurrectionists
 Beauty and the Beast (1993)

Tribute albums
 Where the Pyramid Meets the Eye (1990)
 We're Gonna Miss You: A Tribute to Roky Erickson (2020)
 May the Circle Remain Unbroken: A Tribute to Roky Erickson (2021)

Filmography
 Demon Angel: A Day and Night with Roky Erickson (1984)
You're Gonna Miss Me (2005)

Legacy and influence
Author Jonathan Lethem titled his 2007 novel You Don't Love Me Yet in honor of two (otherwise unconnected) songs of the same title by Erickson and The Vulgar Boatmen. Lethem called Erickson's song "irresistible" and "one of those incredibly versatile songs."

The X-Files episode "Jose Chung's From Outer Space" features a character named "Roky Crikenson", in homage to Erickson. Crikenson, like the original Roky, believes himself to be an alien abductee.

A plotline in an episode of 1990s sitcom The John Larroquette Show revolved around a sighting of reclusive novelist Thomas Pynchon. Pynchon himself did not appear, but agreed to allow his name to be used on the condition that it was specifically mentioned that Pynchon was seen wearing a T-shirt showing a picture of Erickson. This spurred an increase in sales of Erickson's albums.

The album It's Spooky by Daniel Johnston and Jad Fair features the song "I Met Roky Erickson", named after an encounter Johnston had with the artist.

The song "White Faces" was covered by the Dutch occult rock band The Devil's Blood on their 2008 EP album Come Reap

The song "If You Have Ghosts" was covered by the Swedish heavy metal band Ghost on their EP album If You Have Ghost, leading to the title track becoming a common catchphrase and meme among Ghost fans.

References

General sources
 Eye Mind: The Saga of Roky Erickson and The 13th Floor Elevators, The Pioneers of Psychedelic Sound by Paul Drummond; foreword by Julian Cope (Process Media, December 2007),

External links

A Long, Strange Trip - Texas Monthly article
Austin Chronicle article (12/05)
Roky Erickson FAQ
Roky Erickson / 13th Floor Elevators Extensive Discography 
Thirteenth Floor Elevators Discography
[ Roky Erickson on AllMusic.com]
Review of You're Gonna Miss Me soundtrack
November 2008 interview with L.A. Record

1947 births
2019 deaths
American rock guitarists
American male guitarists
American rock singers
American rock songwriters
Musicians from Dallas
American people of Swedish descent
American people of Danish descent
American people of Dutch descent
Outsider musicians
Musicians from Austin, Texas
People with schizophrenia
Protopunk musicians
Psychedelic rock musicians
Sympathy for the Record Industry artists
Trance Syndicate artists
Singer-songwriters from Texas
Guitarists from Texas
20th-century American guitarists
20th-century American male musicians
Restless Records artists
American male singer-songwriters
Anti- (record label) artists